Oliver Leyland (born 17 May 2001) is an English professional rugby league footballer who plays as a  or  for the London Broncos in the Betfred Championship.

He has spent time on loan from the Broncos at the London Skolars in League 1.

Background
Leyland was born in Maidstone, Kent, England.

He played for the Invicta Panthers as a junior. Leyland represented Lancashire against the Australian Schoolboys side. He joined the London Broncos Academy aged 16. 

His brother Bill Leyland is a fellow London player.

Playing career
He joined the London Broncos first team squad at the start of the 2020 season.

He made his professional debut for the London Broncos in April 2021 against the York City Knights.

He spent time on loan from the Broncos at the Skolars in League 1.

Leyland was a runner up in the Championship young player of the year in 2022. He was the Broncos top point scorer in 2022, with 102 points from two tries and 47 goals.

References

External links
London Broncos profile

2001 births
Living people
English rugby league players
London Broncos players
London Skolars players
Rugby league players from Kent
Rugby league halfbacks
Rugby league five-eighths